Inferno: Last in Live (released as Dio's Inferno - The Last In Live in Europe with a different cover photo) is a live album released by the American heavy metal band Dio. It was recorded on their Angry Machines tour in 1996/97. Released in 1998 on Mayhem Records, it consists of tracks from the Ronnie James Dio eras of Rainbow and Black Sabbath, as well as Dio's own material plus a cover of the Deep Purple track Mistreated.

Track listing

Personnel
Dio
Ronnie James Dio – vocals, producer, mixing
Tracy G – guitars
Larry Dennison – bass
Scott Warren – keyboards
Vinny Appice – drums

Production
 Moray McMillian, Martin "Ferrit" Rowe – engineers
Wyn Davies – mixing
Eddie Schreyer – mastering

References

Dio (band) albums
1998 live albums
SPV/Steamhammer live albums